Sebouh Der Abrahamian (July 14, 1924 – December 12, 2009), known professionally as Val Avery, was an American character actor who appeared in hundreds of movies and television shows. In a career that spanned 50 years, Avery appeared in over 100 films and had appearances in over 300 television episodes.

Early life and education
Avery was born in Philadelphia to Armenian parents Megerdich and Arousiag Der Abrahamian. His father was from Sebastia and moved to the United States in 1907. During the Armenian genocide, his grandfather Bedros Der Abrahamian, a priest at the Church of the Holy Mother of God in Sebastia, was murdered. 

In his early years, Avery acted in plays with the Armenian Youth Federation. After serving in the United States Army Air Forces during World War II, he attended the Bessie V. Hicks School of Drama in Philadelphia.

Career
Avery was frequently cast as tough or low-class types, such as policemen, thugs, mobsters, bartenders, and blue-collar workers.

He had television roles in The Twilight Zone episode "The Night of the Meek" (1960) and in four Columbo episodes "A Friend in Deed" (1974), "Dead Weight" (1971), "The Most Crucial Game" (1972), and "Identity Crisis" (1975). Avery's other television appearances include The Untouchables, The Fugitive, Gunsmoke (“The Lure”-1967), The Asphalt Jungle, The Investigators, Mission: Impossible, Daniel Boone, The Munsters, Mannix, The Odd Couple, Kojak, Quincy, M.E., Friday the 13th: The Series, Cannon and Law & Order.

Avery made his film debut with an uncredited role in The Harder They Fall (1956), the last film of Humphrey Bogart. Avery appeared in five John Cassavetes films: Too Late Blues (1961), Faces (1968), Minnie and Moskowitz (1971), The Killing of a Chinese Bookie (1976), and Gloria (1980). His many film credits also include The Long, Hot Summer (1958), The Magnificent Seven (1960), Requiem for a Heavyweight (1962), Hud (1963), Papillon (1973), The Wanderers (1979), The Pope of Greenwich Village (1984), Cobra (1986), and Donnie Brasco (1997).

On Broadway, Avery appeared in a successful 1969-70 revival of The Front Page.

Personal life
Avery and actress Margot Stevenson were married from 1953 until his death. Their daughter, Margot Avery, is also an actress.

Death
Avery died on December 12, 2009 at age 85 in his home in the Greenwich Village section of New York City.

Filmography

Film

Television

References

External links
 
 
 
 

1924 births
2009 deaths
Male actors from Philadelphia
American male film actors
American male television actors
American people of Armenian descent
People from Greenwich Village
20th-century American male actors
United States Army Air Forces soldiers
Western (genre) television actors
Male Western (genre) film actors
United States Army Air Forces personnel of World War II